The 1933 DePauw Tigers football team was an American football team that represented DePauw University as a member of the Indiana Intercollegiate Conference (IIC) during the 1933 college football season. In its fourth season under head coach Ray "Gaumy" Neal, the team compiled a 7–0 record, did not allow its opponents to score a point, and outscored opponents by a total of 136 to 0.

The team played its six home games at Blackstock Field in Greencastle, Indiana.

Schedule

References

DePauw
DePauw Tigers football seasons
College football undefeated seasons
DePauw football